Rolf Rustad is a Norwegian handball player.

He made his debut on the Norwegian national team in 1955, 
and played 60 matches for the national team between 1955 and 1967. He participated at the 1958, 1961, 1964, and 1967 World Men's Handball Championship.

References

Year of birth missing (living people)
Living people
Norwegian male handball players